The 1999 Colonial Athletic Association baseball tournament was held at Grainger Stadium in Kinston, North Carolina, from May 18 through 23.  The event determined the champion of the Colonial Athletic Association for the 1999 season.  Second-seeded  won the tournament for the sixth time and earned the CAA's automatic bid to the 1999 NCAA Division I baseball tournament.

Entering the event, East Carolina had won the most championships, with five.  Old Dominion and Richmond had each won three, while George Mason had won twice.

Format and seeding
The CAA's teams were seeded one to eight based on winning percentage from the conference's round robin regular season.  They played a double-elimination tournament.

Bracket and results

Most Valuable Player
James Molinari was named Tournament Most Valuable Player.  Molinari was an outfielder for East Carolina.

References

Tournament
Colonial Athletic Association Baseball Tournament
Colonial Athletic Association baseball tournament
Colonial Athletic Association baseball tournament
Baseball in North Carolina
College sports in North Carolina
Sports competitions in North Carolina
Tourist attractions in Lenoir County, North Carolina